The 1962 USA–USSR Track and Field Dual Meet was an international track and field competition between the Soviet Union and the United States. The fourth in a series of meetings between the nations, it was held on July 21–22 at the Stanford Stadium in Stanford, California, United States, and finished with the Soviet Union beating the United States 173 to 169. A total of 32 events were contested, 22 by men and 10 by women. The meet marked a high point in public interest in the competition, with an attendance of more than 150,000 over the two-day event – the largest ever on a non-Olympic track and field competition. Even the Soviet workouts attracted crowds of 5000.

World records

Results

Team score

Men

Women

References

Turrini, Joseph M. "It Was Communism Versus the Free World": The USA-USSR Dual Track Meet Series and the Development of Track and Field in the United States, 1958-1985. Journal of Sport History, Vol. 28, No. 3 (Fall 2001), pp. 427–471. Retrieved 2019-07-16.
The Cold War Track Series 1958-1965. Racing Past. Retrieved 2019-07-16.
Лёгкая атлетика. Справочник / Составитель Р. В. Орлов. — М.: «Физкультура и спорт», 1983. — С. 155–178, 385.
Матчи СССР — США // Лёгкая атлетика. Энциклопедия / Авторы-составители В. Б. Зеличёнок, В. Н. Спичков, В. Л. Штейнбах. — М.: «Человек», 2012. — Т. 1. — С. 623. — .

1962
International track and field competitions hosted by the United States
Sports in Stanford, California
International sports competitions in California
USA USSR Track and field
USA USSR Track and field
USA USSR Track and field
USA USSR Track and field
July 1962 sports events in Europe